This is a list of lighthouses in Qatar.

Lighthouses

See also
 Lists of lighthouses and lightvessels

References

External links
 

Qatar
Lighthouses
Lighthouses